Chandranath Hill is the eastern part of the Himalayas separated from the Himalayas. This hill goes south and south-east of the Himalayas and crosses the Feni River through Assam and Tripura states of India and joins Chittagong, Bangladesh. From the Feni river to the Chittagong city, it is about 70 kilometers long. Sitakunda Eco Park is built on the foothills of this hill.

Height and peak
The Chandranath Temple, which is located at the east side of Sitakunda city, is about 1152 feet (around) high and the highest place in Chattogram district. The height of the Rajbari hummock is 889 feet and the height of Sajidhala is 801 feet. The hill height has come down very near the city of Chittagong.

Waterfalls and fountain

There are two waterfalls named Sahasradhara and Suptadhara. In Mirsarai part, there are many more fountains and waterfalls, including Khoiyachora, Harinmara, Hatuvanga, Napittachora, Bagbiyani, Boalia, Amarmanyaka and many more. From this hill on the east, some of the fountains and canals have been gathered in the halda river. Among them, Ghazaria, Bermasia, Fatikchari, Harulalchari and Boalia is the main. On the west, Mahamaya, Mitha Chhara and many other canal and waterfalls have fallen into the Bay of Bengal. Now a rubber dam is built on Mahamaya canal. It is the second-largest man-made lake in Bangladesh after Kaptai Lake.

Gallery

References

External links

Mountains of Bangladesh